Gustavo Bounous was a research medical doctor.

He was born in Luserna, Italy on July 10, 1928.  He was educated at the University of Turin and at the University of Genoa.  Then, he worked as a research fellow in surgery at the Indiana Medical Center.  In 1963 he moved to Canada.  He became a professor of surgery, successively at the Université de Sherbrooke, 1973–1985, after that, at McGill University, 1985–1993.  He died at the age of 83 on December 29, 2011.

Research development
In 1978 he began research at McGill on a dietary protein source that would boost immune system performance.  Bounous contends that a deficiency in the protein glutathione is linked to several diseases, and that a lack of innate cysteine that inhibits glutathione production.

Cysteine-Rich Protein Reverses Weight Loss in Lung Cancer Patients Receiving Chemotherapy or Radiotherapy  Molecular pathogenesis and prevention of prostate cancer.  Whey protein concentrate (WPC) and glutathione modulation in cancer treatment.  The use of a whey protein concentrate in the treatment of patients with metastatic carcinoma: a phase I-II clinical study.  Competition for glutathione precursors between the immune system and the skeletal muscle: pathogenesis of chronic fatigue syndrome.

Selected publications

References

Canadian people of Italian descent
Canadian surgeons
University of Turin alumni
Academic staff of the Université de Sherbrooke
University of Genoa alumni
Academic staff of McGill University